Liat Haninowitz (also "Haninovich"; ליאת חנינוביץ; born January 2, 1966) is an Israeli former Olympic rhythmic gymnast. She was also Israeli National Champion in rhythmic gymnastics in 1984.

Rhythmic gymnastics career
Her club was Hapoel Holon.

She competed for Israel at the 1984 Summer Olympics in Los Angeles, California at the age of 18 in Rhythmic Gymnastics. In Women's Rhythmic Individual All-Around she came in 27th, in Hoop she came in 17th, in Ball she came in tied for 20th, in Clubs she came in tied for 27th, and in Ribbon she came in 31st. She was 5-5.5 (167 cm) tall, and 123 lbs (56 kg) when she competed in the Olympics.

She was also Israeli National Champion in rhythmic gymnastics in 1984.

References

External links
 

Gymnasts at the 1984 Summer Olympics
Israeli rhythmic gymnasts
Living people
1966 births
Olympic gymnasts of Israel